is a Japanese singer and live streamer. He is a member of the J-pop group Strawberry Prince.

Biography 

Colon was recruited by Nanamori to join Strawberry Prince in mid-2016. On January 27, 2021, he released his first solo album, Aster. The album sold 94,000 copies in its debut week and placed first in the Oricon weekly album ranking.

Colon runs a gaming channel on YouTube. He was the most tweeted-about gaming personality in the world in the first half of 2021.

Discography

Albums

Singles

References

External links 

 Official YouTube channel

Living people
Japanese male pop singers
1996 births
Utaite
Japanese YouTubers
People from Saitama Prefecture